Trichopsetta is a genus of small lefteye flounders native to the western Atlantic Ocean.

Species
There are currently four recognized species in this genus:
 Trichopsetta caribbaea W. W. Anderson & Gutherz, 1967 (Caribbean flounder)
 Trichopsetta melasma W. W. Anderson & Gutherz, 1967
 Trichopsetta orbisulcus W. W. Anderson & Gutherz, 1967
 Trichopsetta ventralis (Goode & T. H. Bean, 1885) (Sash flounder)

References

Bothidae
Marine fish genera
Taxa named by Theodore Gill